Laxmipur is small town in Jhapa District of Province No. 1 in Nepal. It covers about 3.16 km² (1.22 mi²) area and distance of 7.08 km (4.40 mi). It is situated in Kankai Municipality between Biring khola to the west and Ghagra khola to the east. People here mostly do shopkeeping and farming as their occupation. The nearest market from here is bibhare bazar, which is only open in Thursday. Holy basil, Pathibhara, Himal are the nearest school and education center from here.

Populated places in Jhapa District